The Hanriot H.34 was a basic trainer designed in France in 1924 which did not reach production. It was a parasol wing aircraft, seating two in tandem.

Design and development

The parasol winged Hanriot H.34 was intended to complement the very successful biplane HD.14. It was designed to be easy to fly and, with a low wing loading, to have low stalling and landing speeds. Both types placed instructor and pupil in tandem, with dual controls.

The wing of the H.34 was in three parts. The two outer sections had parallel, straight and unswept leading and trailing edges and straight, angled tips. They were also cut away at their inner ends, where they met a rectangular, reduced chord centre section, producing a cut-out out over the rear seat. Narrow chord ailerons filled most of the trailing edge. The  wings were of mixed construction with pairs of duralumin spars and wooden ribs but the ailerons were all-metal. Pairs of parallel, rearward-leaning struts linked the lower fuselage and the outer wing spars and four vertical struts from the upper fuselage to the centre section formed a cabane.

The H.34 was powered initially by a  Le Rhône 9C rotary engine, but could also be powered by  Anzani 10C or  Salmson 9Ac radial engines. Its neat cowling merged into the circular section, aluminium-covered front fuselage which extended back to the forward cockpit.  The cockpit section and rear fuselage had a rectangular section defined by four spruce longerons and was fabric covered. The instructor sat in the forward seat, with the pupil behind in a cockpit wide enough to accept two sitting side-by-side if necessary.

Aft, the fuselage tapered in plan to a conventional empennage. Its tailplane, with a similar plan to the wing, was mounted on top of the fuselage at an angle of incidence that could be adjusted in flight. It was braced by parallel pairs of struts from the lower longerons and carried angular elevators. The fin was rounded, bearing a full, curved rudder which reached down to the keel and operated in an elevator cut-out.

The outer ends of the axle were rubber sprung on V-struts from the lower longerons and its centre supported from a false axle.

The first flight was made in 1924; though the date is unknown, it was flying by mid-September, taking part in the Auvergne aero-club national rally. By November it was under test at Villacoublay.

The H.34 was developed into the Hanriot H.35 advanced trainer which had the same layout and appearance and a wing of the same construction and dimensions, but with a much more powerful  Hispano-Suiza 8Ab and an dural-framed fuselage. It was longer, heavier and faster.

Variants
H.34The basic original aircraft powered by a  Le Rhône 9C.
At least one built or converted from the H.34.
H.34terPowered by a  Salmson 9Ac. At least one built or converted from the H.34.
H.35A trainer derived from the H.34, powered by a  Hispano-Suiza 8Ab. 13 built.
H.36Floatplane development of the H.35, powered by a  Salmson 9Ac. 1 built (50 floatplane versions ordered by Yugoslavia, delivery/production uncertain.)

Specifications (H.34)

References

1920s French military trainer aircraft
Hanriot aircraft
Parasol-wing aircraft
Aircraft first flown in 1924